Sérgio Barbosa Dias Leite (born 16 August 1979) is a Portuguese retired footballer who played as a goalkeeper.

Club career
After emerging from local Boavista FC's youth ranks, Porto-born Leite found it hard to find a spot in the first team, barred by William Andem first then Ricardo. He went on to serve four loans in the second division, in representation of F.C. Maia, S.C. Espinho, F.C. Penafiel and Leça FC.

Definitely released in 2003, Leite then had two unassuming spells in England, first with Charlton Athletic which also loaned him to A.D. Ovarense back in his country, then with Hull City. With the latter team until February 2006, he only had one Football League Cup appearance to his credit.

Leite spent 2006–07 with two Romanian sides, appearing only once in Liga I with FC Vaslui, then spent the following season in Cyprus with lowly Atromitos Yeroskipou. In the summer of 2008 he returned to Boavista, immersed in a deep financial crisis and now in the second level (soon to be third).

For the 2009–10 campaign, Leite moved sides again, joining Gondomar S.C. – also in division three – a club to which former Boavista chairman Valentim Loureiro also had connections. He left in June 2011 at the age of 32 and retired shortly after, subsequently working as a players' agent.

Honours
Individual
Toulon Tournament Best Goalkeeper: 2000

References

External links

National team data 

1979 births
Living people
Footballers from Porto
Portuguese footballers
Association football goalkeepers
Liga Portugal 2 players
Segunda Divisão players
Boavista F.C. players
F.C. Maia players
S.C. Espinho players
F.C. Penafiel players
Leça F.C. players
A.D. Ovarense players
Gondomar S.C. players
Charlton Athletic F.C. players
Hull City A.F.C. players
Liga I players
Liga II players
FC Vaslui players
FC Brașov (1936) players
Cypriot Second Division players
Atromitos Yeroskipou players
Portugal youth international footballers
Portugal under-21 international footballers
Portuguese expatriate footballers
Expatriate footballers in England
Expatriate footballers in Romania
Expatriate footballers in Cyprus
Portuguese expatriate sportspeople in England
Portuguese expatriate sportspeople in Romania
Portuguese expatriate sportspeople in Cyprus